The Clube de Regatas do Flamengo Youth Academy are the youth academy of Clube de Regatas do Flamengo, a Brazilian football club based in Rio de Janeiro. Is composed of several youth teams and is considered one of the most prolific football academies in Brazil as also in the world.

Flamengo's Youth Squads of all categories have won trophies at national and international level. Numerous international players have graduated from the academy team. Notable academy graduates in recent years include Lyon midfielder Lucas Paquetá, Real Madrid forward Vinícius Júnior, 2016 Summer Olympic Games Gold Medal midfielder Renato Augusto alongside many first team players, such as midfielder Reinier Jesus.

The youth sector is composed of various squads divided by age groups. Clube de Regatas do Flamengo is responsible for over 100 young athletes in 5 different categories: U-11, U-13, U-15, U-17, U-20. The U-20 squad currently plays in the Campeonato Brasileiro Sub-20, the Copa do Brasil Sub-20, the Copa São Paulo de Futebol Júnior, the Campeonato Carioca Sub-20 and the Torneio Octávio Pinto Guimarães. The U-17 squad currently plays in the Campeonato Brasileiro Sub-17, the Copa do Brasil Sub-17 and the Campeonato Carioca Sub-17.

Stadium

Flamengo's Youth Academy home stadium is nominally the Estádio da Gávea (officially named the Estádio José Bastos Padilha at Flamengo's Gávea Headquarters), which was inaugurated on September 4, 1938, and has a capacity of 4,000 people. The stadium is named after José Bastos Padilha, Flamengo's president at the time of the stadium's construction, from 1933 to 1937. Gávea Stadium is not actually located in the neighborhood of Gávea but rather in Leblon.

Since the 1990s, the stadium has been used almost exclusively for the club's youth and women's teams' matches, and as the training ground for the senior team.

Ninho do Urubu

All the youth teams currently train at the club's main training ground, Ninho do Urubu, located in the Vargem Grande neighborhood, in the West Zone. These athletes have modern dormitories, living room, recreation room and cafeteria. The athletes also have medical, dental and psychological assistance.

On the morning of February 8, 2019 a fire broke out in the living quarters of several youth academy players while they were sleeping. Ten players between the ages of 14 and 17 were killed, and three others were hospitalized with burn injuries.

Honours

Under-20s

Under-17s

Others

Youth squads

Flamengo U20 squad

Flamengo U17 squad

Staff

Flamengo U20 current staff

Flamengo U17 current staff

Players

Appearances
Players with 100+ appearances for Flamengo.
All matches, including friendlies and non-official matches.
Players in bold currently still play for the club.
Players in italic currently still play professional football.

Internationals
Players who made 10 appearances or more for his country at full international level.
Players in bold currently still play for the club.
Players in italic currently still play professional football.

Highest transfer fees received
Top 10 highest transfer fees received.
The list is ordered by the amount of R$ received.

Former coaches
Coaches who win the Copa São Paulo de Futebol Júnior.
Coaches in bold currently still train for the club.
Coaches in italic currently still train in professional football.

References

External links
 Flamengo Youth Academy

Youth
Flamengo